Macropoliana ferax is a moth of the family Sphingidae. It is known from highland forests in East Africa, including the Democratic Republic of the Congo, Rwanda, Tanzania, Kenya and Malawi.

The length of the forewings is 45–52 mm. It is very similar to Macropoliana natalensis, but smaller and darker, particularly in the females. Most have a series of small paired yellow dorsal spots on the abdomen.

References

Macropoliana
Moths described in 1916
Moths of Africa